Clavatula is a genus of sea snails, marine gastropod mollusks in the family Clavatulidae.

Description
In this genus, the shell is fusiform, with a well-produced spire. The whorls are coronated with tubercles or short spines at the suture;. The aperture is oval. The columellar lip  is smooth, arcuate, and callous behind. The outer lip is thin and arcuated, with the anal sinus situated below the sutural coronal. The operculum is semioval with its nucleus about the middle, on the inner side.

The foot is large, short and obtuse behind. The eyes are placed externally near the extremity of the tentacles. The radula contains a small unicuspid central tooth with single sharp laterals (formula :1-1-1).

The species mostly inhabits the west coast of Africa.

Species
Species within the genus Clavatula include:

 Clavatula ahuiri Cossignani & Ardovini, 2014
 †Clavatula aralica (Luković, 1924) (an extinct species from the Eocene in western Kazakhstan (Tshegan Formation) ) 
 Clavatula asamusiensis Nomura & Zinbo, 1940
 †Clavatula asperulata (Lamarck, 1822) 
 Clavatula bimarginata (Lamarck, 1822)
  Clavatula boreointerrupta Kautsky, 1925 
 Clavatula caerulea (Weinkauff & Kobelt, 1875)
 †Clavatula carinifera Grateloup, 1832 
 Clavatula christianae Nolf, 2011
 Clavatula colini Von Maltzan, 1883
 †Clavatula concatenata (Grateloup, 1832) 
 Clavatula congoensis Nolf & Verstraeten, 2008
 Clavatula coronata Lamarck, 1801
 Clavatula cossignanii Ardovini, 2004
 Clavatula debilis (R.B. Hinds, 1843)
 Clavatula decorata Sowerby III, 1916
 Clavatula delphinae Nolf, 2008
 Clavatula diadema (Kiener, 1840)
 Clavatula filograna Odhner, 1923
 Clavatula flammulata Knudsen, 1952
 Clavatula gabonensis Melvill, 1923
 †Clavatula glaberrima praecedens (Peyrot, 1931)  
 Clavatula gracilior Sowerby II, 1870
 Clavatula hattenbergeri Nolf & Verstraeten, 2008
 Clavatula helena Bartsch, 1915
 †Clavatula helwerdae Ceulemans, Van Dingenen & Landau, 2018
 Clavatula imperialis Lamarck, 1816
 Clavatula knudseni Nolf & Verstraeten, 2007
 Clavatula kraepelini (Strebel, 1914)
 Clavatula lelieuri (Récluz, 1851)
 Clavatula luctuosa (Hinds, 1843)
 Clavatula malala Bozzetti, 2018
 Clavatula martensi Von Maltzan, 1883
 Clavatula matthiasi Nolf, 2008
 Clavatula milleti (Petit de la Saussaye, 1851)
 Clavatula muricata (Lamarck, 1822)
 Clavatula mystica (Reeve, 1843)
 Clavatula nathaliae Nolf, 2006
 Clavatula perronii (Reeve, 1843)
 Clavatula petzyae Boyer & Ryall, 2006
 Clavatula pseudomystica Nolf, 2008
 Clavatula quinteni Nolf & Verstraeten, 2006
 Clavatula regia (Röding, 1798)
 †Clavatula reginae Hoernes & Auinger, 1891
 Clavatula rubrifasciata (Reeve, 1845)
 Clavatula sacerdos (Reeve, 1845)
 Clavatula smithi Knudsen, 1952
 Clavatula solangeae Bozzetti, 2006
 Clavatula strebeli Knudsen, 1952
 Clavatula taxea (Röding, 1798)
 Clavatula tripartita (Weinkauff & Kobelt, 1876)
 Clavatula virgineus (Dillwyn, 1817)
 Clavatula xanteni Nolf & Verstraeten, 2006

Nomen dubium
 Clavatula erecta W. H. Turton, 1932
Species brought into synonymy 
 Clavatula albicans Hinds, 1843: synonym of Splendrillia albicans (Hinds, 1843)
 Clavatula amabilis Hinds, 1843: synonym of Tritonoturris amabilis (Hinds, 1843)
 Clavatula argillacea Hinds, 1843: synonym of Etrema argillacea (Hinds, 1843)
 Clavatula auriculifera Lamarck, J.B.P.A. de M. 1816: synonym of Clavus canalicularis (Röding, 1798)
 Clavatula bella Hinds, 1843: synonym of Bellacythara bella (Hinds, 1843)
 Clavatula candida Hinds, 1843: synonym of Glyphostoma candida (Hinds, 1843)
 Clavatula candida (Philippi, 1848): synonym of Pusionella valida (Dunker, 1852)
 Clavatula coelata Hinds, 1843: synonym of Crassispira coelata (Hinds, 1843)
 Clavatula crenularis Lamarck, 1816: synonym of Ptychobela nodulosa (Gmelin, 1791)
 Clavatula echinata Lamarck, 1816: synonym of Clavus flammulatus Montfort, 1810
 Clavatula ericea Hinds, 1843: synonym of Lioglyphostoma ericea (Hinds, 1843)
 Clavatula fimbriata Hinds, 1843: synonym of Daphnellopsis fimbriata (Hinds, 1843)
 Clavatula flammea Hinds, 1843: synonym of Daphnella flammea (Hinds, 1843)
 Clavatula flavidula (Lamarck, 1822): synonym of Clathrodrillia flavidula (Lamarck, 1822)
 Clavatula fulva Hinds, 1843: synonym of Clavus fulva (Hinds, 1843)
 Clavatula gravis (Hinds, 1843): synonym of Makiyamaia gravis (Hinds, 1843)
 Clavatula griffithii Gray, 1834: synonym of Ptychobela griffithii (Gray, 1834)
 Clavatula haliplex Bartsch, 1915: synonym of Toxiclionella haliplex (Bartsch, 1915)
 Clavatula halistrepta Bartsch, 1915: synonym of Clionella halistrepta (Bartsch, 1915)
 Clavatula hottentota (E. A. Smith, 1882): synonym of Clavus hottentotus (E. A. Smith, 1882)
 Clavatula impressa Hinds, 1843: synonym of Kylix impressa (Hinds, 1843)
 Clavatula kraussii (E. A. Smith, 1877): synonym of Clionella kraussii (E. A. Smith, 1877)
 Clavatula laeta Hinds, 1843: synonym of Splendrillia laeta (Hinds, 1843)
 Clavatula lineata Lamarck, 1816: synonym of Perrona lineata (Lamarck, 1816)
 Clavatula lobatopsis Barnard, 1963: synonym of Clionella lobatopsis (Barnard, 1963)
 Clavatula marmarina (Watson, 1881): synonym of Fenimorea marmarina (Watson, 1881)
 Clavatula merita Hinds, 1843: synonym of Tenaturris merita (Hinds, 1843)
 Clavatula metula Hinds, 1843: synonym of Anarithma metula (Hinds, 1843)
 Clavatula micans Hinds, 1843: synonym of Globidrillia micans (Hinds, 1843)
 Clavatula neglecta Hinds, 1843: synonym of Glyphostoma neglecta (Hinds, 1843)
 Clavatula nitens Hinds, 1843: synonym of Agladrillia nitens (Hinds, 1843)
 Clavatula obesa Reeve: synonym of Perrona obesa (Reeve, 1842)
 Clavatula occata Hinds, 1843: synonym of Diptychophlia occata (Hinds, 1843)
 Clavatula pardalis Hinds, 1843: synonym of Anachis pardalis (Hinds, 1843)
 Clavatula parilis E. A. Smith, 1902: synonym of Clavatula tripartita (Weinkauff, 1876)
 Clavatula pfefferi (Strebel, 1912): synonym of Fusiturris pfefferi (Strebel, 1912)
 Clavatula plumbea Hinds, 1843: synonym of Kurtziella plumbea (Hinds, 1843)
 Clavatula pudica Hinds, 1843: synonym of Agladrillia pudica (Hinds, 1843)
 Clavatula pungens Gould, 1860: synonym of Veprecula pungens (Gould, 1860)
 Clavatula pyramis Hinds, 1843: synonym of Pseudorhaphitoma pyramis (Hinds, 1843)
 Clavatula quisqualis Hinds, 1843: synonym of Leptadrillia quisqualis (Hinds, 1843)
 Clavatula rava Hinds, 1843: synonym of Clathurella rava (Hinds, 1843)
 Clavatula rigida Hinds, 1843: synonym of Clathurella rigida (Hinds, 1843)
 Clavatula robusta Hinds, 1843: synonym of Cheungbeia robusta (Hinds, 1843)
 Clavatula rubida Hinds, 1843: synonym of Lienardia rubida (Hinds, 1843)
 Clavatula rubiginosa Hinds, 1843: synonym of Otitoma rubiginosa (Hinds, 1843)
 Clavatula rubrofasciata Reeve: synonym of Clavatula rubrifasciata (Reeve, 1845)
 Clavatula scalaris Hinds, 1843: synonym of Tritonoturris scalaris (Hinds, 1843)
 Clavatula sculpta Hinds, 1843: synonym of Rimosodaphnella sculpta (Hinds, 1843)
 Clavatula semicostata (Kiener, 1840): synonym of Clionella semicostata (Kiener, 1840)
 Clavatula sinensis Hinds, 1843: synonym of Crassispira sinensis (Hinds, 1843)
 Clavatula sinuata (Born, 1778): synonym of Clionella sinuata (Born, 1778)
 Clavatula spicata Hinds, 1843: synonym of Inquisitor spicata (Hinds, 1843)
 Clavatula spirata Lamarck: synonym of Perrona spirata (Lamarck, 1816)
 Clavatula spurca Hinds, 1843: synonym of Etrema spurca (Hinds, 1843)
 Clavatula striata Gray, 1826: synonym of Epideira striata (Gray, 1826)
 Clavatula subspirata (von Martens, 1902): synonym of Perrona subspirata (von Martens, 1902)
 Clavatula subventricosa (E. A. Smith, 1877): synonym of Clionella subventricosa (E. A. Smith, 1877)
 Clavatula taxus : synonym of Clavatula taxea (Röding, 1798) (incorrect subsequent spelling)
 Clavatula tessellata Hinds, 1843: synonym of Kermia tessellata (Hinds, 1843)
 Clavatula tumida Sowerby II, 1870: synonym of Toxiclionella tumida (Sowerby II, 1870)
 Clavatula turriplana (G.B. Sowerby III, 1903): synonym of Turricula turriplana (Sowerby III, 1903)

References

External links